The missing 54 are 54 soldiers and officers of the Indian Armed Forces who went missing in action during the Indo-Pakistani War of 1971 and whom the Indian government believes to be secretly held by Pakistan. Pakistan denies the existence of such prisoners of war.

History
During the war, The fifth battalion of the Assam Regiment was deployed as part of 191 Infantry Brigade on the west of Munnawar Tawi River in the Chambb region. 10 Infantry Division on the Indian side faced 23 Division on the Pakistani side. 5 Sikh were at Chhamb and were in the middle of the brigade group with 5 Assam and 4/1 Gorkha Rifles on either side. On 4 December, Pakistani artillery and PAF were in action in the areas of 5 Sikh and 5 Assam, the Pakistani infantry supported by armour captured Mandiala North after fighting. On 5 December, two tanks of Deccan Horse and a platoon of 5 Sikh recaptured the Mandiala Bridge. These three battalions were subjected to intense shelling and repeated PAF attacks. During this battle, Major Ashok Suri went missing.
 
The Pakistan government invited family members to Pakistan to identify, if found, its missing defence personnel in November 1982 when India and Pakistan signed a protocol on exchange of prisoners when Zia Ul Haq visited India. On 30 May 1983, Narasimha Rao said that he would take up at the highest level the visit of the parents of missing defence personnel to Pakistan. A delegation of six next-of-kins were allowed to go, it was made very clear that this was a classified visit that the press were not invited to. The families left on 12 September 1983, Monday to visit Lahore. This was the first time the Indians had got consular access after 1971. The families got to know that some officials of the MEA will also be going with them to Multan jail. Indira Gandhi was making aggressive statements in favour of Khan Abdul Gafar Khan and the MQM movement which was irritating Pakistan. On 14 September they flew to Multan, India was supposed to grant Pakistani officials reciprocal access to 25 Pakistani prisoners at Patiala jail which did not happen. The news came in Pakistani papers that "India goes back on its words". On 15 September 1983, the soldiers families visited Multan jail.

On the Eastern front where there were 93,007 POWs (of which 72,795 were soldiers), an agreement was signed by the Foreign Ministers of India, Bangladesh and Pakistan on 30 April 1974 at New Delhi. Thereafter the Pakistani POWs captured on the Eastern front were also repatriated.

See also 

 Indo-Pakistani War of 1971
 Timeline of the Bangladesh Liberation War
 Military plans of the Bangladesh Liberation War
 Mitro Bahini order of battle
 Pakistan Army order of battle, December 1971
 Evolution of Pakistan Eastern Command plan
 1971 Bangladesh genocide
 Operation Searchlight
 Indo-Pakistani wars and conflicts
 Military history of India
 List of military disasters
 List of wars involving India

References

External links
 http://www.tribuneindia.com/2006/20061217/spectrum/main1.htm
 http://www.dailytimes.com.pk/default.asp?page=story_19-1-2005_pg7_28
 http://fateh.sikhnet.com/sikhnet/discussion.nsf/78f5a2ff8906d1788725657c00732d6c/7bfcf2a9609cc48987256f9b006234e2!OpenDocument

People of the Indo-Pakistani War of 1971
Prisoners of war held by Pakistan